Irena Vrkljan (21 August 1930 – 23 March 2021) was a Croatian writer and translator.

She was born in Belgrade and was educated at Zagreb University and the Deutsche Film- und Fernsehakademie Berlin. She lived in both Zagreb and Berlin, writing in both Croatian and German. Vrkljan wrote scripts for film and radio. She also translated works by Croatian authors into German. In 1964, she toured the United States, sponsored in part by American Women in Radio and Television.

In 2006, she was awarded the Vladimir Nazor Award.

Selected works 
 Paralele (Parallels), poetry (1957)
 Doba prijateljstva (Time of friendship), novel (1963)
 Soba, taj strašni vrt (The room, this frightful garden), poetry (1966)
 U koži moje sestre (In my sister's skin), poetry (1982)
 Svila, škare, autobiography (1984), translated as The silk, the shears, and Marina, or, About biography, received the Ksaver Šandor Gjalski Prize
 Marina ili o biografiji, autobiography (1985), translated as Marina or On Memory
 Dora, ove jeseni (Dora), novel (1991)
 Pred crvenim zidom: 1991-1993 (Before the red wall: 1991-1993), novel 1994
 Posljednje putovanje u Beč (The last trip to Geneva), mystery novel (2000)

References

External links 
 

1930 births
2021 deaths
20th-century Croatian poets
Croatian novelists
Croatian women writers
University of Zagreb alumni
Croatian expatriates in Germany
Croatian translators
Croatian women poets
20th-century women writers